Twister Mania launched in November 2011 for the Microsoft Kinect for Xbox 360 video game console as a digital version of the Twister board game.

Developed by Naked Sky Entertainment, Twister Mania is published by Majesco Entertainment and is rated E for Everyone by the ESRB.

Reception
Reviews of Twister Mania by its target audience are generally favorable.  The game has been called out by Family Friendly Gaming as one of the most family friendly games of 2011, with a score of 96, where it was praised for both its fun gameplay and innovative UI.
The UI is similarly called out in other reviews.

References

External links
Official Twister Mania Website

2011 video games
505 Games games
Kinect games
Majesco Entertainment games
Video games based on board games
Video games developed in the United States
Xbox 360 games
Xbox 360-only games
Naked Sky Entertainment games